Joseph Cockroft (20 June 1911 – February 1994) was an English footballer who played in the Football League for Rotherham United, West Ham United, Sheffield Wednesday and Sheffield United.

Cockroft played for Yorkshire Paper Mills, Barnsley Old Boys, Ardsley Athletic, Wombwell, Rotherham United and then Gainsborough Trinity before moving to West Ham United, then of Division Two, in 1933.

Signed after a months trial from Gainsborough by Charlie Paynter, Cockroft made his West Ham debut on 14 April 1933, having made just four reserve appearances for the club. Drafted in after injuries to first-choice left-halves Albert Cadwell and Joe Musgrave, he made the position his own and rarely missed a game up to the outbreak of World War II.

Cockroft played as a left-half, but often switched positions with Len Goulden during matches to dumbfound oppositions. He was an ever-present in the team for the 1933–34, 1934–35, 1935–36 and 1936–37 seasons, making 217 consecutive appearances.

Cockroft played in the first three games of the 1939–40 season, but these were expunged from the records after the League was suspended following the outbreak of World War II. The war saw Cockroft's home destroyed in the Blitz. He was part of West Ham's War Cup-winning side of 1940, appearing in all 9 games including the final, and made 20 appearances in the League South. He guested for Sheffield Wednesday as direction of labour laws compelled his employment at Edgar Allen and Company, a steelworks in Sheffield. He made 198 wartime appearances for Wednesday, more than any other player, and scored 13 goals. He played for the Owls in the northern final of the War Cup in 1943, and went on to join the club after hostilities ended.

Cockroft spent almost three years at Hillsborough after the war, making a total of 97 appearances in all competitions. His debut came on 5 January 1946 in a goalless FA Cup 3rd round first leg game against Mansfield Town. He went on to play in all of the Owls' FA Cup games in the 1945–46 season; the club were eventually knocked out by Stoke City in the 5th round following comprehensive wins over York City and Mansfield.

He joined Sheffield United for £4,000 in November 1948 and became the oldest First Division debutant as a 37-year-old. He left a year later to take on a player-manager role at Wisbech Town. His tenure of 1,065 days makes him one of Wisbech's longest serving managers.

He was also an FA coach, outside of football, Cockroft had many other interests. He was a keen golfer, swimmer and motorist, and was also interested in anatomy. He was landlord of the Angel Inn, Wisbech. He retired to Hunstanton, Norfolk with his wife Winifred. He died on 8 February, 1994. He had two children, a son Terry and daughter Joyce.

Career statistics

References

1911 births
1994 deaths
Footballers from Barnsley
English footballers
Association football wing halves
Wombwell F.C. players
Rotherham United F.C. players
Gainsborough Trinity F.C. players
West Ham United F.C. players
Sheffield Wednesday F.C. players
Sheffield United F.C. players
Wisbech Town F.C. players
English Football League players
Sheffield Wednesday F.C. wartime guest players
Huddersfield Town A.F.C. wartime guest players
English football managers